The Boston Trojans were an American basketball team based in Boston, Massachusetts that was a member of the American Basketball League.

Year-by-year

Notable players
Notable players with the Original Celtics include:
Lou Bender (1910–2009), pioneer player with the Columbia Lions and in early pro basketball, who was later a successful trial attorney.

References

1934 establishments in Massachusetts
1935 disestablishments in Massachusetts
American Basketball League (1925–1955) teams
Basketball teams established in 1934
Basketball teams disestablished in 1935
Trojans
Defunct sports teams in Massachusetts